Robin Yvette Allen (born February 6,1968), known professionally as the Lady of Rage, is an American rapper, singer and actress best known for her collaborations with several other Death Row Records artists, including Dr. Dre and Snoop Dogg on the seminal albums, The Chronic and Doggystyle. The Lady of Rage has been described as "one of the most skillful female MCs" with a "mastery of flow" and "hard-core lyrics".

Biography
In the summer of 1988, the Lady of Rage met Shahkim, now known as Black Rushn of the Original Outlaw Brothers, a rap group from Queens, New York. Once Shahkim convinced the Lady of Rage that he could get her a record deal, he brought her into his group. The members of the Outlaw Brothers made Rage a member of the group, and they eventually signed to a production deal with the L.A. Posse (who went on to produce several big hits for LL Cool J). At the time, the L.A. Posse had several artists within their group including, MC Wind, and the Real Roxanne. The L.A. Posse also had several relationships with different labels. Rage, along with all of the artists in the camp worked diligently writing and recording out of Chung King Studios in lower Manhattan. In 1991, the Lady of Rage met with Chubb Rock, providing vocals for the track "Bring Em Home Safe" on his album The One, which she recorded under the name of 'Rockin’ Robin'.

Dr. Dre discovered the Lady of Rage after hearing the vocals she recorded for the L.A. Posse's album, They Come in All Colors (1991). She later  appeared on several tracks on Dr. Dre's 1992 album The Chronic, and on Snoop Dogg's Doggystyle in 1993.

On July 26, 1994, the Lady of Rage released the hit single "Afro Puffs" (from the soundtrack to Above the Rim) which reached No. 5 on the Billboard Hot Rap Singles chart. She also made an appearance on Tha Dogg Pound's album Dogg Food on the track "Do What I Feel". Though she had made more than a dozen appearances on soundtracks as well as albums from her Death Row Records cohorts, the Lady of Rage didn't release her debut album until 1997. Her debut solo album, Necessary Roughness, was released in June 1997 and peaked at No. 7 on the Billboard R&B Album chart and 32 on the Billboard 200 Albums chart. Her solo album was originally called Eargasm, but it was continually pushed back - the album was meant to have been the next album on Death Row Records after The Chronic, and then after Doggystyle, before finally being released in 1997.

After the release of her album and a guest-appearance with Gang Starr alongside Kurupt ("You Know My Steez (Three Men and a Lady Remix)") in 1998, Rage left Death Row Records and the music industry to focus on acting, appearing in an episode of Kenan & Kel. The Lady of Rage then went on to be featured in the sitcom The Steve Harvey Show on The WB as Coretta Cox, a recurring role she played from 1997 to 2000. She also had a role in Next Friday as Baby D, the sister of Day Day's ex-girlfriend.

From 2000 to 2002, she made three appearances on songs by Snoop Dogg: "Set It Off" from his album Tha Last Meal (2000), a solo track, "Unfucwitable", on Snoop Dogg Presents...Doggy Style Allstars Vol. 1 (2002), and "Batman & Robin", from his album Paid tha Cost to Be da Boss (2002).

In 2007, Rage signed to Shante Broadus' label, Boss Lady Entertainment, and recorded a mixtape called, From VA 2 LA. She also made appearances on Bigg Snoop Dogg Presents…Welcome to tha Chuuch: Da Album (2005) and Cali Iz Active (2006) in the song "Keep it Gangsta".

In 2008, Rage was a part of the FEM (Females Earning Money) Movement along with fellow female rappers Babs (of Da Band), Lady Luck, and Amil. In 2008, she performed with MC Lyte, Yo-Yo, and Salt-n-Pepa at the BET Hip Hop Awards. In the summer of 2010 she joined Snoop Dogg during his headlining set at the Rock the Bells festival concert series, along with Warren G, RBX, and Tha Dogg Pound for a performance of the Doggystyle album in its entirety.

In 2011, Rage was part of the group N'Matez, along with Daz Dillinger, Kurupt, and RBX. They released the track "Trajical".

Rage signed on to play herself in Dogg Pound 4 Life, a biographical film focusing on the rise of the 1990s rap group, Tha Dogg Pound and was pictured in an Instagram post with Daz Dillinger.

Rage also made an appearance on MC Eiht's 2017 album Which Way Iz West on the track "Heart Cold".

Discography

Studio albums
 Necessary Roughness (1997)

Mixtapes
 VA to LA (2006)

Filmography

Film

Television

Documentary

References

Further reading

External links

Living people
American women rappers
African-American women rappers
Death Row Records artists
African-American actresses
American actresses
Rappers from Virginia
Southern hip hop musicians
People from Farmville, Virginia
Gangsta rappers
21st-century American rappers
21st-century women rappers
1968 births
21st-century American women